The 2011 Richmond Spiders football team represented the University of Richmond during the 2011 NCAA Division I FCS football season. Richmond competed as a member of the Colonial Athletic Association (CAA) under interim head football coach Wayne Lineburg and played its home games at E. Claiborne Robins Stadium.

Latrell Scott, who was entering his second season as the head coach at Richmond, resigned on August 23, 2011, just ten days before the team's opening game.  Offensive coordinator Wayne Lineburg was named interim head coach for the 2011 season.

Schedule
Richmond's 2011 schedule kicked off against Football Bowl Subdivision (FBS) team Duke and included other non-conference games against Wagner and VMI.  The schedule also included an eight-game CAA slate including a game against new CAA football member Old Dominion and wrapping up against rival William & Mary in the Capital Cup.

References

Richmond
Richmond Spiders football seasons
Richmond Spiders football